The Acre Subdistrict, alternatively spelt as Akka Subdistrict or Akko Subdistrict is one of Israel's sub-districts in Northern District. The subdistrict is composed of mostly of the historical Mandatory Acre Subdistrict.

References